Zenobia, called honeycup, is a North American genus of shrubs in the family Ericaceae.

Description
Zenobia  is a hairless shrub, sometimes with a waxy coating on the foliage. The leaves are elliptical or egg-shaped. The plant has numerous white flowers in flat-topped or elongated arrays, each flower has 5 separate sepals and 5 united petals, forming a bell-shaped corolla. Each flower can produce up to 200 egg-shaped seeds in a dry capsule.

Fossil record
10 fossil fruits of †Zenobia fasterholtensis have been described from middle Miocene strata of the Fasterholt area near Silkeborg in Central Jutland, Denmark.

Species
Zenobia cassinefolia (Vent.) Pollard 
Zenobia pulverulenta (W. Bartram ex Willd.) Pollard 
Zenobia speciosa (Michx.) D. Don

References

Vaccinioideae
Flora of the Southeastern United States
Ericaceae genera